The Three Sisters is a mountain immediately north of Fernie, British Columbia, northwest of the confluence of Fairy Creek with the Elk River.   It should not to be confused with the Alberta Rockies' peaks of the same name, located further north outside Canmore.

The Three Sisters is a popular subject for photographers.

Local legend states this peak came about because a young Indian chief could not choose between three girls for a wife, so he was turned into Mount Proctor. The maidens were so distraught, they prayed to be turned into mountains as well, and became the Three Sisters.

See also
 Three Sisters Range

References

Elk Valley (British Columbia)
Two-thousanders of British Columbia
Canadian Rockies
Kootenay Land District